Acacia cognata, commonly known as bower wattle, river wattle or narrow-leaved bower wattle, is a tree or shrub species that is endemic to south eastern Australia.

Description
It has smooth, grey or grey-brown coloured bark on the trunk and larger branches. The branchlets have low longitudinal green to brown coloured ridges that alternate with sticky resinous bands. The sparsely hairy to glabrous phyllodes have ciliate margins with three main longitudinal veins.

Distribution
It is native to the states of New South Wales and Victoria, where it grows in granite-based soils as part of dry sclerophyll forest communities.

Taxonomy
The species was first formally described by the botanist Karel Domin in 1926 as part of the work Beitrage zur Flora und Pflanzengeographie Australiens as published in the work Bibliotheca Botanica. It was reclassified as Racosperma cognatum in 2003 by Leslie Pedley then transferred back to genus Acacia in 2006.

Cultivars
A number of cultivars have been developed:
'Bower Beauty'
'Cousin Itt' (Citation required - cousin It is Casuarina glauca, not an acacia.)
'Copper Tips'
'Fettuccini'
'Green Mist'
'Lime Magik'
'Limelight'
'Mop Top'
'Waterfall'

References

cognata
Flora of New South Wales
Flora of Victoria (Australia)
Fabales of Australia
Plants described in 1926
Taxa named by Karel Domin